Project Orion was a study conducted between the 1950s and 1960s by the United States Air Force, DARPA, and NASA for the purpose of measuring the efficacy of a starship directly propelled by a series of explosions of atomic bombs behind the craft—nuclear pulse propulsion. Early versions of this vehicle were proposed to take off from the ground; later versions were presented for use only in space. Six non-nuclear tests were conducted using models. The project was eventually abandoned for multiple reasons, including the Partial Test Ban Treaty, which banned nuclear explosions in space, and concerns over nuclear fallout.

The idea of rocket propulsion by combustion of an explosive substance was first proposed by Russian explosives expert Nikolai Kibalchich in 1881, and in 1891 similar ideas were developed independently by German engineer Hermann Ganswindt. Robert A. Heinlein mentions powering spaceships with nuclear bombs in his 1940 short story "Blowups Happen". Real life proposals of nuclear propulsion were first made by Stanislaw Ulam in 1946, and preliminary calculations were made by F. Reines and Ulam in a Los Alamos memorandum dated 1947. The actual project, initiated in 1958, was led by Ted Taylor at General Atomics and physicist Freeman Dyson, who at Taylor's request took a year away from the Institute for Advanced Study in Princeton to work on the project.

The Orion concept offered high thrust and high specific impulse, or propellant efficiency, at the same time. The unprecedented extreme power requirements for doing so would be met by nuclear explosions, of such power relative to the vehicle's mass as to be survived only by using external detonations without attempting to contain them in internal structures. As a qualitative comparison, traditional chemical rockets—such as the Saturn V that took the Apollo program to the Moon—produce high thrust with low specific impulse, whereas electric ion engines produce a small amount of thrust very efficiently. Orion would have offered performance greater than the most advanced conventional or nuclear rocket engines then under consideration. Supporters of Project Orion felt that it had potential for cheap interplanetary travel, but it lost political approval over concerns about fallout from its propulsion.

The Partial Test Ban Treaty of 1963 is generally acknowledged to have ended the project.  However, from Project Longshot to Project Daedalus, Mini-Mag Orion, and other proposals which reach engineering analysis at the level of considering thermal power dissipation, the principle of external nuclear pulse propulsion to maximize survivable power has remained common among serious concepts for interstellar flight without external power beaming and for very high-performance interplanetary flight.  Such later proposals have tended to modify the basic principle by envisioning equipment driving detonation of much smaller fission or fusion pellets, in contrast to Project Orion's larger nuclear pulse units (full nuclear bombs) based on less speculative technology.

Basic principles

The Orion nuclear pulse drive combines a very high exhaust velocity, from 19 to 31 km/s (12 to 19 mi/s) in typical interplanetary designs, with meganewtons of thrust. Many spacecraft propulsion drives can achieve one of these or the other, but nuclear pulse rockets are the only proposed technology that could potentially meet the extreme power requirements to deliver both at once (see spacecraft propulsion for more speculative systems).

Specific impulse (Isp) measures how much thrust can be derived from a given mass of fuel, and is a standard figure of merit for rocketry.  For any rocket propulsion, since the kinetic energy of exhaust goes up with velocity squared (kinetic energy = ½ mv2), whereas the momentum and thrust go up with velocity linearly (momentum = mv), obtaining a particular level of thrust (as in a number of g acceleration) requires far more power each time that exhaust velocity and Isp are much increased in a design goal. (For instance, the most fundamental reason that current and proposed electric propulsion systems of high Isp tend to be low thrust is due to their limits on available power. Their thrust is actually inversely proportional to Isp if power going into exhaust is constant or at its limit from heat dissipation needs or other engineering constraints.) The Orion concept detonates nuclear explosions externally at a rate of power release which is beyond what nuclear reactors could survive internally with known materials and design.

Since weight is no limitation, an Orion craft can be extremely robust. An uncrewed craft could tolerate very large accelerations, perhaps 100 g. A human-crewed Orion, however, must use some sort of damping system behind the pusher plate to smooth the near instantaneous acceleration to a level that humans can comfortably withstand – typically about 2 to 4 g.

The high performance depends on the high exhaust velocity, in order to maximize the rocket's force for a given mass of propellant. The velocity of the plasma debris is proportional to the square root of the change in the temperature (Tc) of the nuclear fireball. Since such fireballs typically achieve ten million degrees Celsius or more in less than a millisecond, they create very high velocities. However, a practical design must also limit the destructive radius of the fireball. The diameter of the nuclear fireball is proportional to the square root of the bomb's explosive yield.

The shape of the bomb's reaction mass is critical to efficiency. The original project designed bombs with a reaction mass made of tungsten. The bomb's geometry and materials focused the X-rays and plasma from the core of nuclear explosive to hit the reaction mass. In effect each bomb would be a nuclear shaped charge.

A bomb with a cylinder of reaction mass expands into a flat, disk-shaped wave of plasma when it explodes. A bomb with a disk-shaped reaction mass expands into a far more efficient cigar-shaped wave of plasma debris. The cigar shape focuses much of the plasma to impinge onto the pusher-plate. For greatest mission efficiency the rocket equation demands that the greatest fraction of the bomb's explosive force be directed at the spacecraft, rather than being spent isotropically.

The maximum effective specific impulse, Isp, of an Orion nuclear pulse drive generally is equal to:

where C0 is the collimation factor (what fraction of the explosion plasma debris will actually hit the impulse absorber plate when a pulse unit explodes), Ve is the nuclear pulse unit plasma debris velocity, and gn is the standard acceleration of gravity (9.81 m/s2; this factor is not necessary if Isp is measured in N·s/kg or m/s). A collimation factor of nearly 0.5 can be achieved by matching the diameter of the pusher plate to the diameter of the nuclear fireball created by the explosion of a nuclear pulse unit.

The smaller the bomb, the smaller each impulse will be, so the higher the rate of impulses and more than will be needed to achieve orbit. Smaller impulses also mean less g shock on the pusher plate and less need for damping to smooth out the acceleration.

The optimal Orion drive bomblet yield (for the human crewed 4,000 ton reference design) was calculated to be in the region of 0.15 kt, with approx 800 bombs needed to orbit and a bomb rate of approx 1 per second.

Sizes of vehicles
The following can be found in George Dyson's book. The figures for the comparison with Saturn V are taken from this section and converted from metric (kg) to US short tons (abbreviated "t" here).

In late 1958 to early 1959, it was realized that the smallest practical vehicle would be determined by the smallest achievable bomb yield. The use of 0.03 kt (sea-level yield) bombs would give vehicle mass of 880 tons. However, this was regarded as too small for anything other than an orbital test vehicle and the team soon focused on a 4,000 ton "base design".

At that time, the details of small bomb designs were shrouded in secrecy. Many Orion design reports had all details of bombs removed before release. Contrast the above details with the 1959 report by General Atomics, which explored the parameters of three different sizes of hypothetical Orion spacecraft:

The biggest design above is the "super" Orion design; at 8 million tonnes, it could easily be a city. In interviews, the designers contemplated the large ship as a possible interstellar ark. This extreme design could be built with materials and techniques that could be obtained in 1958 or were anticipated to be available shortly after.

Most of the three thousand tonnes of each of the "super" Orion's propulsion units would be inert material such as polyethylene, or boron salts, used to transmit the force of the propulsion units detonation to the Orion's pusher plate, and absorb neutrons to minimize fallout. One design proposed by Freeman Dyson for the "Super Orion" called for the pusher plate to be composed primarily of uranium or a transuranic element so that upon reaching a nearby star system the plate could be converted to nuclear fuel.

Theoretical applications
The Orion nuclear pulse rocket design has extremely high performance. Orion nuclear pulse rockets using nuclear fission type pulse units were originally intended for use on interplanetary space flights.

Missions that were designed for an Orion vehicle in the original project included single stage (i.e., directly from Earth's surface) to Mars and back, and a trip to one of the moons of Saturn.

Freeman Dyson performed the first analysis of what kinds of Orion missions were possible to reach Alpha Centauri, the nearest star system to the Sun. His 1968 paper "Interstellar Transport" (Physics Today, October 1968, pp. 41–45) retained the concept of large nuclear explosions but Dyson moved away from the use of fission bombs and considered the use of one megaton deuterium fusion explosions instead. His conclusions were simple: the debris velocity of fusion explosions was probably in the 3000–30,000 km/s range and the reflecting geometry of Orion's hemispherical pusher plate would reduce that range to 750–15,000 km/s.

To estimate the upper and lower limits of what could be done using contemporary technology (in 1968), Dyson considered two starship designs. The more conservative energy limited pusher plate design simply had to absorb all the thermal energy of each impinging explosion (4×1015 joules, half of which would be absorbed by the pusher plate) without melting. Dyson estimated that if the exposed surface consisted of copper with a thickness of 1 mm, then the diameter and mass of the hemispherical pusher plate would have to be 20 kilometers and 5 million tonnes, respectively. 100 seconds would be required to allow the copper to radiatively cool before the next explosion. It would then take on the order of 1000 years for the energy-limited heat sink Orion design to reach Alpha Centauri.

In order to improve on this performance while reducing size and cost, Dyson also considered an alternative momentum limited pusher plate design where an ablation coating of the exposed surface is substituted to get rid of the excess heat. The limitation is then set by the capacity of shock absorbers to transfer momentum from the impulsively accelerated pusher plate to the smoothly accelerated vehicle. Dyson calculated that the properties of available materials limited the velocity transferred by each explosion to ~30 meters per second independent of the size and nature of the explosion. If the vehicle is to be accelerated at 1 Earth gravity (9.81 m/s2) with this velocity transfer, then the pulse rate is one explosion every three seconds. The dimensions and performance of Dyson's vehicles are given in the following table:

Later studies indicate that the top cruise velocity that can theoretically be achieved are a few percent of the speed of light (0.08–0.1c). An atomic (fission) Orion can achieve perhaps 9%–11% of the speed of light. A nuclear pulse drive starship powered by fusion-antimatter catalyzed nuclear pulse propulsion units would be similarly in the 10% range and pure Matter-antimatter annihilation rockets would be theoretically capable of obtaining a velocity between 50% to 80% of the speed of light. In each case saving fuel for slowing down halves the maximum speed. The concept of using a magnetic sail to decelerate the spacecraft as it approaches its destination has been discussed as an alternative to using propellant; this would allow the ship to travel near the maximum theoretical velocity.

At 0.1c, Orion thermonuclear starships would require a flight time of at least 44 years to reach Alpha Centauri, not counting time needed to reach that speed (about 36 days at constant acceleration of 1g or 9.8 m/s2). At 0.1c, an Orion starship would require 100 years to travel 10 light years. The astronomer Carl Sagan suggested that this would be an excellent use for current stockpiles of nuclear weapons.

As part of the development of Project Orion, to garner funding from the military, a derived "space battleship" space-based nuclear-blast-hardened nuclear-missile weapons platform was mooted in the 1960s by the United States Air Force. It would comprise the USAF "Deep Space Bombardment Force".

Later developments

A concept similar to Orion was designed by the British Interplanetary Society (B.I.S.) in the years 1973–1974. Project Daedalus was to be a robotic interstellar probe to Barnard's Star that would travel at 12% of the speed of light. In 1989, a similar concept was studied by the U.S. Navy and NASA in Project Longshot. Both of these concepts require significant advances in fusion technology, and therefore cannot be built at present, unlike Orion.

From 1998 to the present, the nuclear engineering department at Pennsylvania State University has been developing two improved versions of project Orion known as Project ICAN and Project AIMStar using compact antimatter catalyzed nuclear pulse propulsion units, rather than the large inertial confinement fusion ignition systems proposed in Project Daedalus and Longshot.

Costs
The expense of the fissionable materials required was thought to be high, until the physicist Ted Taylor showed that with the right designs for explosives, the amount of fissionables used on launch was close to constant for every size of Orion from 2,000 tons to 8,000,000 tons. The larger bombs used more explosives to super-compress the fissionables, increasing efficiency. The extra debris from the explosives also serves as additional propulsion mass.

The bulk of costs for historical nuclear defense programs have been for delivery and support systems, rather than for production cost of the bombs directly (with warheads being 7% of the U.S. 1946–1996 expense total according to one study). After initial infrastructure development and investment, the marginal cost of additional nuclear bombs in mass production can be relatively low.  In the 1980s, some U.S. thermonuclear warheads had $1.1 million estimated cost each ($630 million for 560). For the perhaps simpler fission pulse units to be used by one Orion design, a 1964 source estimated a cost of $40000 or less each in mass production, which would be up to approximately $0.3 million each in modern-day dollars adjusted for inflation.

Project Daedalus later proposed fusion explosives (deuterium or tritium pellets) detonated by electron beam inertial confinement. This is the same principle behind inertial confinement fusion. Theoretically, it could be scaled down to far smaller explosions, and require small shock absorbers.

Vehicle architecture

From 1957 to 1964 this information was used to design a spacecraft propulsion system called Orion, in which nuclear explosives would be thrown behind a pusher-plate mounted on the bottom of a spacecraft and exploded. The shock wave and radiation from the detonation would impact against the underside of the pusher plate, giving it a powerful push. The pusher plate would be mounted on large two-stage shock absorbers that would smoothly transmit acceleration to the rest of the spacecraft.

During take-off, there were concerns of danger from fluidic shrapnel being reflected from the ground. One proposed solution was to use a flat plate of conventional explosives spread over the pusher plate, and detonate this to lift the ship from the ground before going nuclear. This would lift the ship far enough into the air that the first focused nuclear blast would not create debris capable of harming the ship.

A preliminary design for a nuclear pulse unit was produced. It proposed the use of a shaped-charge fusion-boosted fission explosive. The explosive was wrapped in a beryllium oxide channel filler, which was surrounded by a uranium radiation mirror. The mirror and channel filler were open ended, and in this open end a flat plate of tungsten propellant was placed.

At 1 microsecond after ignition the gamma bomb plasma and neutrons would heat the channel filler and be somewhat contained by the uranium shell. At 2–3 microseconds the channel filler would transmit some of the energy to the propellant, which vaporized. The flat plate of propellant formed a cigar-shaped explosion aimed at the pusher plate.

This temperature emits ultraviolet light, which is poorly transmitted through most plasmas. This helps keep the pusher plate cool. The cigar shaped distribution profile and low density of the plasma reduces the instantaneous shock to the pusher plate.

Because the momentum transferred by the plasma is greatest in the center, the pusher plate's thickness would decrease by approximately a factor of 6 from the center to the edge. This ensures the change in velocity is the same for the inner and outer parts of the plate.

At low altitudes where the surrounding air is dense, gamma scattering could potentially harm the crew without a radiation shield; a radiation refuge would also be necessary on long missions to survive solar flares. Radiation shielding effectiveness increases exponentially with shield thickness, see gamma ray for a discussion of shielding. On ships with a mass greater than  the structural bulk of the ship, its stores along with the mass of the bombs and propellant, would provide more than adequate shielding for the crew. Stability was initially thought to be a problem due to inaccuracies in the placement of the bombs, but it was later shown that the effects would cancel out.

Numerous model flight tests, using conventional explosives, were conducted at Point Loma, San Diego in 1959. Film of the tests has been transcribed to video and were featured on the BBC TV program "To Mars by A-Bomb" in 2003 with comments by Freeman Dyson and Arthur C. Clarke. The model landed by parachute undamaged and is in the collection of the Smithsonian National Air and Space Museum.

The first proposed shock absorber was a ring-shaped airbag. It was soon realized that, should an explosion fail, the  pusher plate would tear away the airbag on the rebound. So a two-stage detuned spring and piston shock absorber design was developed. On the reference design the first stage mechanical absorber was tuned to 4.5 times the pulse frequency whilst the second stage gas piston was tuned to 0.5 times the pulse frequency. This permitted timing tolerances of 10 ms in each explosion.

The final design coped with bomb failure by overshooting and rebounding into a center position. Thus following a failure and on initial ground launch it would be necessary to start or restart the sequence with a lower yield device. In the 1950s methods of adjusting bomb yield were in their infancy and considerable thought was given to providing a means of swapping out a standard yield bomb for a smaller yield one in a 2 or 3 second time frame or to provide an alternative means of firing low yield bombs. Modern variable yield devices would allow a single standardized explosive to be tuned down (configured to a lower yield) automatically.

The bombs had to be launched behind the pusher plate with enough velocity to explode  beyond it every 1.1 seconds. Numerous proposals were investigated, from multiple guns poking over the edge of the pusher plate to rocket propelled bombs launched from roller coaster tracks, however the final reference design used a simple gas gun to shoot the devices through a hole in the center of the pusher plate.

Potential problems
Exposure to repeated nuclear blasts raises the problem of ablation (erosion) of the pusher plate. Calculations and experiments indicated that a steel pusher plate would ablate less than 1 mm, if unprotected. If sprayed with an oil it would not ablate at all (this was discovered by accident; a test plate had oily fingerprints on it and the fingerprints suffered no ablation). The absorption spectra of carbon and hydrogen minimize heating. The design temperature of the shockwave, emits ultraviolet light. Most materials and elements are opaque to ultraviolet, especially at the  pressures the plate experiences. This prevents the plate from melting or ablating.

One issue that remained unresolved at the conclusion of the project was whether or not the turbulence created by the combination of the propellant and ablated pusher plate would dramatically increase the total ablation of the pusher plate. According to Freeman Dyson, in the 1960s they would have had to actually perform a test with a real nuclear explosive to determine this; with modern simulation technology this could be determined fairly accurately without such empirical investigation.

Another potential problem with the pusher plate is that of spalling—shards of metal—potentially flying off the top of the plate. The shockwave from the impacting plasma on the bottom of the plate passes through the plate and reaches the top surface. At that point, spalling may occur, damaging the pusher plate. For that reason, alternative substances—plywood and fiberglass—were investigated for the surface layer of the pusher plate and thought to be acceptable.

If the conventional explosives in the nuclear bomb detonate but a nuclear explosion does not ignite, shrapnel could strike and potentially critically damage the pusher plate.

True engineering tests of the vehicle systems were thought to be impossible because several thousand nuclear explosions could not be performed in any one place. Experiments were designed to test pusher plates in nuclear fireballs and long-term tests of pusher plates could occur in space. The shock-absorber designs could be tested at full-scale on Earth using chemical explosives.

However, the main unsolved problem for a launch from the surface of the Earth was thought to be nuclear fallout. Freeman Dyson, group leader on the project, estimated back in the 1960s that with conventional nuclear weapons, each launch would statistically cause on average between 0.1 and 1 fatal cancers from the fallout. That estimate is based on no-threshold model assumptions, a method often used in estimates of statistical deaths from other industrial activities. Each few million dollars of efficiency indirectly gained or lost in the world economy may statistically average lives saved or lost, in terms of opportunity gains versus costs. Indirect effects could matter for whether the overall influence of an Orion-based space program on future human global mortality would be a net increase or a net decrease, including if change in launch costs and capabilities affected space exploration, space colonization, the odds of long-term human species survival, space-based solar power, or other hypotheticals.

Danger to human life was not a reason given for shelving the project. The reasons included lack of a mission requirement, the fact that no one in the U.S. government could think of any reason to put thousands of tons of payload into orbit, the decision to focus on rockets for the Moon mission, and ultimately the signing of the Partial Test Ban Treaty in 1963. The danger to electronic systems on the ground from an electromagnetic pulse was not considered to be significant from the sub-kiloton blasts proposed since solid-state integrated circuits were not in general use at the time.

From many smaller detonations combined, the fallout for the entire launch of a  Orion is equal to the detonation of a typical 10 megaton (40 petajoule) nuclear weapon as an air burst, therefore most of its fallout would be the comparatively dilute delayed fallout. Assuming the use of nuclear explosives with a high portion of total yield from fission, it would produce a combined fallout total similar to the surface burst yield of the Mike shot of Operation Ivy, a 10.4 Megaton device detonated in 1952. The comparison is not quite perfect as, due to its surface burst location, Ivy Mike created a large amount of early fallout contamination. Any comparison would be influenced by how population dosage is affected by detonation locations, with very remote sites preferred.

With special designs of the nuclear explosive, Ted Taylor estimated that fission product fallout could be reduced tenfold, or even to zero, if a pure fusion explosive could be constructed instead.  A 100% pure fusion explosive has yet to be successfully developed, according to declassified US government documents, although relatively clean PNEs (Peaceful nuclear explosions) were tested for canal excavation by the Soviet Union in the 1970s with 98% fusion yield in the Taiga test's 15 kiloton devices, 0.3 kilotons fission, which excavated part of the proposed Pechora–Kama Canal.

The vehicle's propulsion system and its test program would violate the Partial Test Ban Treaty of 1963, as currently written, which prohibits all nuclear detonations except those conducted underground as an attempt to slow the arms race and to limit the amount of radiation in the atmosphere caused by nuclear detonations. There was an effort by the US government to put an exception into the 1963 treaty to allow for the use of nuclear propulsion for spaceflight but Soviet fears about military applications kept the exception out of the treaty.  This limitation would affect only the US, Russia, and the United Kingdom.  It would also violate the Comprehensive Nuclear-Test-Ban Treaty which has been signed by the United States and China as well as the de facto moratorium on nuclear testing that the declared nuclear powers have imposed since the 1990s.

The launch of such an Orion nuclear bomb rocket from the ground or low Earth orbit would generate an electromagnetic pulse that could cause significant damage to computers and satellites as well as flooding the van Allen belts with high-energy radiation. Since the EMP footprint would be a few hundred miles wide, this problem might be solved by launching from very remote areas. A few relatively small space-based electrodynamic tethers could be deployed to quickly eject the energetic particles from the capture angles of the Van Allen belts.

An Orion spacecraft could be boosted by non-nuclear means to a safer distance only activating its drive well away from Earth and its satellites. The Lofstrom launch loop or a space elevator hypothetically provide excellent solutions; in the case of the space elevator, existing carbon nanotubes composites, with the possible exception of Colossal carbon tubes, do not yet have sufficient tensile strength. All chemical rocket designs are extremely inefficient and expensive when launching large mass into orbit but could be employed if the result were cost effective.

Notable personnel

 Lew Allen, Contract Manager
 Jerry Astl, explosives engineer
 Jeremy Bernstein, physicist
 Ed Creutz, physicist
 Brian Dunne, Orion's chief scientist
 Freeman Dyson, physicist
 Harry Finger, physicist
 Burt Freeman, physicist
 Harris Mayer, physicist
 James Nance, Project Director
 H. Pierre Noyes, physicist
 Kedar "Bud" Pyatt, mathematician
 Morris Scharff, physicist
  Charles Clark Loomis, physicist
 Ted Taylor, Project Director
 Stanislaw Ulam, mathematician
 Micheal Treshow, physicist
  Ron F. Prater, USAF Liaison	
 Edward B. Giller, USAF Liaison
 Don Prickett, USAF Liaison
 Howard R. Kratz, physicist
 Carlo Riparbelli, physicist
 Thomas Macken, physicist
  David Weiss, test pilot
 Rudy A. Cesena, physicist
 Ed A. Day, physicist
 Mike R. Ames, physicist
 Richard D. Morton, physicist
 Reed Watson, physicist
 Richard Goddard, physicist
 Menley Young, physicist
 Michael J. Feeney, physicist
 Jim W. Morris, physicist
 R. N. House, physicist
 Leon Dial, physicist
 W. B. McKinney, physicist
 J. R. Pope, physicist
 Fred W. Ross, physicist
 Perry B Ritter, physicist
 Walt England, physicist
 William(Bill) G. Vulliet, physicist
 John Illes, security guard
 Lois Illes, secretary
 Jonnie Stahl, secretary
 Don Mixson, USAF Liaison
 Robert B Duffield, Chemist
 John J Dishuck, USAF Liaison
 Fred Gorschboth, USAF Liaison
 Ralph Stahl, physicist

Operation Plumbbob

A test that was similar to the test of a pusher plate occurred as an accidental side effect of a nuclear containment test called "Pascal-B" conducted on 27 August 1957. The test's experimental designer Dr. Robert Brownlee performed a highly approximate calculation that suggested that the low-yield nuclear explosive would accelerate the massive (900 kg) steel capping plate to six times escape velocity. The plate was never found but Dr. Brownlee believes that the plate never left the atmosphere; for example, it could have been vaporized by compression heating of the atmosphere due to its high speed. The calculated velocity was interesting enough that the crew trained a high-speed camera on the plate which, unfortunately, only appeared in one frame indicating a very high lower bound for the speed of the plate.

Notable appearances in fiction

The first appearance of the idea in print appears to be Robert A. Heinlein's 1940 short story, "Blowups Happen."

As discussed by Arthur C. Clarke in his recollections of the making of 2001: A Space Odyssey in The Lost Worlds of 2001, a nuclear-pulse version of the U.S. interplanetary spacecraft Discovery One was considered. However the Discovery in the movie did not use this idea, as Stanley Kubrick thought it might be considered parody after making Dr. Strangelove or: How I Learned to Stop Worrying and Love the Bomb.

An Orion spaceship features prominently in the science fiction novel Footfall by Larry Niven and Jerry Pournelle. In the face of an alien siege/invasion of Earth, the humans must resort to drastic measures to get a fighting ship into orbit to face the alien fleet.

The novel Anathem by Neal Stephenson features a nuclear pulse propulsion starship.

The opening premise of the show Ascension is that in 1963 President John F. Kennedy and the U.S. government, fearing the Cold War will escalate and lead to the destruction of Earth, launched the Ascension, an Orion-class spaceship, to colonize a planet orbiting Proxima Centauri, assuring the survival of the human race.

Author Stephen Baxter's science fiction novel Ark employs an Orion-class generation ship to escape ecological disaster on Earth.

Towards the conclusion of his  Empire Games trilogy, Charles Stross includes a spacecraft modeled after Project Orion. The crafts' designers, constrained by a 1960's level of industrial capacity, intend it to be used to explore parallel worlds and to act as a nuclear deterrent, leapfrogging their foes more contemporary capabilities.

See also
 AIMStar
 Antimatter-catalyzed nuclear pulse propulsion
 Helios (propulsion system)
 NERVA (Nuclear Engine for Rocket Vehicle Application)
 Nuclear propulsion
 Project Pluto
 Project Prometheus
 Project Valkyrie
 Peaceful nuclear explosion

References

Further reading

"Nuclear Pulse Propulsion (Project Orion) Technical Summary Report" RTD-TDR-63-3006 (1963–1964); GA-4805 Vol. 1: Reference Vehicle Design Study, Vol. 2: Interaction Effects, Vol. 3: Pulse Systems, Vol. 4: Experimental Structural Response. (From the National Technical Information Service, U.S.A.)
"Nuclear Pulse Propulsion (Project Orion) Technical Summary Report" 1 July 1963 – 30 June 1964, WL-TDR-64-93; GA-5386 Vol. 1: Summary Report, Vol. 2: Theoretical and Experimental Physics, Vol. 3: Engine Design, Analysis and Development Techniques, Vol. 4: Engineering Experimental Tests. (From the National Technical Information Service, U.S.A.)
General Atomics, Nuclear Pulse Space Vehicle Study, Volume I -- Summary, September 19, 1964
General Atomics, Nuclear Pulse Space Vehicle Study, Volume III -- Conceptual Vehicle Designs And Operational Systems, September 19, 1964
General Atomics, Nuclear Pulse Space Vehicle Study, Volume IV -- Mission Velocity Requirements And System Comparisons, February 28, 1966
General Atomics, Nuclear Pulse Space Vehicle Study, Volume IV -- Mission Velocity Requirements And System Comparisons (Supplement), February 28, 1966

NASA, Nuclear Pulse Vehicle Study Condensed Summary Report (General Dynamics Corp), January 14, 1964

External links

The case for Orion
Freeman Dyson talking about Project Orion
Electromagnetic Pulse Shockwaves as a result of Nuclear Pulse Propulsion
George Dyson talking about Project Orion at TED

Orion
Hypothetical spacecraft
Single-stage-to-orbit
Space access
Orion
Freeman Dyson
Interstellar travel